Guro Bergsvand (born 3 March 1994) is a Norwegian footballer who plays as a defender for Brighton & Hove Albion and the Norway national team. She got her debut at the national team at the age of 27, and she scored in her first match. After the 2021 season in Toppserien, she was named the players' role model of the year. The jury said that she, among others, was an inspiration for all young players that meet adversity, doubt themselves and need evidence for what might seem impossible, is actually possible.

Club career 
Bergsvand started playing football for Heming, before she changed to Lyn at a young age. She was part of the team that took Lyn from division three to  the first divisjon, and she became the captain of the team. Before the 2014 season, she went to Stabæk, where she played six matches during the spring in Toppserien, before she moved to the USA to play football for California Golden Bears at the University of California, Berkeley. The summer of 2015, she played a few matches for Lyn in 1.divisjon before she returned to USA.

In USA, she tore both her meniscus and one of the cruciate ligaments in the knee after she twisted it. The first time she was back again, she fell and fractured her kneecap. The injuries prevented her from playing the rest of that season in 2015, and the following season.

In 2017, she had again a short stay in Lyn in the first division and she finished her college studies.

After returning to Norway, she signed for Stabæk in 2018. After just half of the season, one of the ligaments in the same knee that was previously injured, ruptured. She managed to get back from this injury as well and played the remaining 13 matches in Toppserien and one match in the Norwegian Women's Cup for Stabæk. The Summer of 2019, Sandviken wanted to sign her, but she said no since it didn't feel right to leave Stabæk, which at that point was at the bottom of the league. Røa, Vålrenga and Kolbotn were all also among clubs that wanted to sign her.

After it became clear that Stabæk would be relegated, it became official that Bergsvand left the club and signed for Sandviken. She was in 2021 part of the team who won Toppserien for the first time in Sandviken's history. After the season, NTB, Norske Fotballkvinner and Sportkollektivet all placed her on the team of the season. She extended the contract with Sandviken, who changed name to Brann, after the 2021 season.

Brighton & Hove Albion
On 5 January 2023, Bergsvand signed a two-and-a-half year contract with Brighton & Hove Albion.

International career 
She has played matches for U16, U19, U23, and the national team.

The first time she was part of the national team was at the age of 27 in September 2021. She got her debut against Armenia, 16 September 2021, and she also scored the first goal of the match in her debut.

International goals

Honours 
Sandviken

 Toppserien 2021

Individual

 The player's role model of the year, Toppserien 2021

Personal life 
Guro Bergsvand is the daughter of the retired football player Jo Bergsvand.

She has a degree in Media studies from the University of California, Berkley. In addition to being a football player, she also works as a marketing consultant. She says that she needs to do something outside just playing football, otherwise she would get bored.

References

1994 births
Living people
Footballers from Oslo
Norwegian women's footballers
Norway women's youth international footballers
Norway women's international footballers
Lyn Fotball Damer players
Stabæk Fotball Kvinner players
SK Brann Kvinner players
Brighton & Hove Albion W.F.C. players
Toppserien players
Women's association football midfielders
California Golden Bears women's soccer players
Norwegian expatriate women's footballers
Expatriate women's soccer players in the United States
Norwegian expatriate sportspeople in the United States
Norwegian expatriate sportspeople in England
UEFA Women's Euro 2022 players
Association football midfielders